The 2016 Women's World Team Squash Championships is the women's edition of the 2016 World Team Squash Championships, which serves as the world team championship for squash players. The event held in Issy-les-Moulineaux, France and takes place from November 27 to December 3, 2016. The tournament is organized by the World Squash Federation and the French Squash Federation. The Egypt team won its third World Team Championships, beating the England team in the final.

Participating teams
17 teams competed in these world championships from all of the five confederations: Africa, America, Asia, Europe and Oceania.

Seeds

Squads

  Egypt
 Nour El Sherbini
 Nouran Gohar
 Raneem El Weleily
 Omneya Abdel Kawy

  New Zealand
 Joelle King
 Amanda Landers-Murphy
 Megan Craig
 Emma Millar

  India
 Joshna Chinappa
 Dipika Pallikal
 Akanksha Salunkhe
 Sunayna Kuruvilla

  Mexico
 Diana García
 Nayelly Hernández
 Dina Anguiano
 Sarahi Lopez

  England
 Laura Massaro
 Alison Waters
 Sarah-Jane Perry
 Victoria Lust

  United States
 Amanda Sobhy
 Olivia Blatchford
 Sabrina Sobhy
 Reeham Sadky

  Canada
 Samantha Cornett
 Hollie Naughton
 Danielle Letourneau
 Nikki Todd

  Wales
 Tesni Evans
 Nia Davies
 Lowri Roberts
 Hannah Davies

  Malaysia
 Nicol David
 Delia Arnold
 Rachel Arnold
 Sivasangari Subramaniam

  Australia
 Rachael Grinham
 Donna Urquhart
 Christine Nunn
 Tamika Saxby

  Netherlands
 Milou van der Heijden
 Natalie Grinham
 Tessa Ter Sluis
 Milja Dorenbos

  Austria
 Birgit Coufal
 Sandra Polak
 Sabrina Rehman
 Judith van der Merwe

  Hong Kong
 Annie Au
 Joey Chan
 Liu Tsz Ling
 Tong Tsz Wing

  France
 Camille Serme
 Coline Aumard
 Chloé Mesic
 Laura Pomportes

  Japan
 Misaki Kobayashi
 Satomi Watanabe
 Risa Sugimoto
 Mami Sakai

  Germany
 Sina Wall
 Sharon Sinclair
 Franziska Hennes
 Saskia Beinhard

  Spain
 Xisela Aranda Núñez
 Cristina Gómez
 Marta Latorre Ramirez
 Marina De Juan Gallach

Group stage

Pool A 
November 28, 2016

November 29, 2016

November 30, 2016

Pool B 
November 28, 2016

November 29, 2016

November 30, 2016

Pool C 
November 28, 2016

November 29, 2016

November 30, 2016

Pool D 
November 28, 2016

November 29, 2016

November 30, 2016

Finals

Draw

Results

Quarterfinals

Semifinals

Final

Post-tournament team ranking

See also 
 World Team Squash Championships

References

External links 
FFSquash Website
Women's World Team Squash Championships 2016 Official Website

Squash tournaments in France
World Squash Championships
Womens World
W
2016 in women's squash
International sports competitions hosted by France